The Olmec Stone Heads are a semi-professional ice hockey team in Mexico City, Mexico. They play in the Liga Mexicana Élite.

History
The club was founded in 2017 as one of the charter members of the Liga Mexicana Élite, alongside Aztec Eagle Warriors, Mayan Astronomers and Teotihuacan Priests, that started in October 2017.

The team took its name from the Olmecs, a Mesoamerican civilization, known for their stone colossal heads, hence the name.

Season-by-season record

References

Sports teams in Mexico City
Ice hockey teams in Mexico
Ice hockey clubs established in 2017
2017 establishments in Mexico